Microschismus antennatus is a species of moth of the family Alucitidae. It was described by Thomas Bainbrigge Fletcher in 1909 and is known from South Africa.

References

Ustjuzhanin & Kovtunovich, 2011. "A revision of the genus Microschismus Fletcher, 1909 (Lepidoptera: Alucitidae)". African Invertebrates. Vol. 52 Issue 2, p. 557.

Endemic moths of South Africa
Alucitidae
Moths of Africa
Moths described in 1909